Reg Milburn (25 March 1927 – 3 July 2002) was an Australian rules footballer who played with Fitzroy in the Victorian Football League (VFL).

Milburn came from Epping and won the Diamond Valley Football League's award for the best and fairest player in 1947.

He appeared in the final two rounds of the 1949 VFL season for Fitzroy.

References

External links
 
 

1927 births
Australian rules footballers from Victoria (Australia)
Fitzroy Football Club players
Epping Football Club players
2002 deaths